Volodymyr Ivashko may refer

 Volodymyr Antonovych Ivashko (also known as Vladimir Ivashko), a Communist leader of Ukraine
 Volodymyr Oleksandrovych Ivashko, a Governor of Chernihiv Oblast